Rosanky is an unincorporated community located on Farm to Market Road 535 in southern Bastrop County, Texas, United States. Rosanky has a post office with the ZIP code 78953. The town is named for Ed Rosanky, who emigrated from Prussia and settled in the area in 1854.

Museum
Central Texas Museum of Automotive History

Climate
The climate in this area is characterized by hot, humid summers and generally mild to cool winters.  According to the Köppen Climate Classification system, Rosanky has a humid subtropical climate, abbreviated "Cfa" on climate maps.

Education
It is in the Smithville Independent School District, which operates Smithville High School.

References

External links
 

Unincorporated communities in Bastrop County, Texas
Unincorporated communities in Texas
Greater Austin